Cubbyhole, sometimes written as Cubby Hole, in Manhattan's West Village, is one of New York City's three remaining lesbian bars as of 2022.

History 
The bar now known as Cubbyhole dates back to 1987 when it was owned and operated by Tanya Saunders and Debbie Fierro as a refuge for all comers under the name DT's Fat Cat. It has remained both a lesbian and queer friendly location throughout its history as bar patronage shifted throughout New York City's LGBTQ+ community. In 1994 Saunders bought the name Cubbyhole from the owner of an already-closed lesbian bar, and the bar has operated under that name since. It is owned and operated by Lisa Menichino who had been a bar-tender under Saunders' ownership. 

Cubbyhole is at 281 W. 12th Street, the same location where Saunders operated DT's Fat Cat. The former Cubby Hole was located in what is now Henrietta Hudson.

While there was some concern in early 2022 when the bar closed for renovation, it reopened in spring.

See also

Lesbian Bar Project
LGBT culture in New York City

References

1987 establishments in New York City
Bars (establishments)
Lesbian culture in New York (state)
LGBT drinking establishments in New York City
LGBT nightclubs in New York (state)
Nightclubs in New York City
Organizations established in 1987
West Village